Alexandra Wejchert (16 October 1921 – 24 October 1995) was a Polish-Irish sculptor, known for her use of perspex (plexiglass), stainless steel, bronze and neon colours.

Early life
Alexandra Wejchert was born in Kraków, Poland on 16 October 1921. Her father was Tedeusz Wejchert, who ran a shipping business out of Gdansk. She entered University of Warsaw to study architecture in 1939, and while there witnessed the German invasion of Poland during World War II. Having graduated in 1949, she worked as a town planner and architect in Warsaw, where she graduated from the Academy of Fine Arts in 1956 with a degree before moving to Italy.

Career

Wejchert held her first solo show in 1959 in the Galeria dell’ Obelisco, Rome. She then returned to Warsaw where she was featured in the National Museum "Fifteen years of Polish art" exhibition in 1961. At this time she was still working as an architect, but did not support the social realism of Soviet architecture, which led her to deciding to concentrate solely on art from 1963. She left communist Poland in 1964, when she accompanied her younger brother, the architect Andrej Wejchert, when he and his wife Danuta moved to Dublin, Ireland.

She held her first solo show in Dublin in November 1966 with an exhibition of 30 paintings at The Molesworth Gallery. In 1967 she showed Blue relief at the Irish Exhibition of Living Art, which was a wall relief of "sculpted paintings" which were precursors to her later free-standing sculpture. Wejchert won the Carroll Open award of £300 at the 1968 Irish Exhibition of Living Art for Frequency No. 5. Also in 1968 she held a solo exhibition in the Galerie Lamert, Paris, becoming a regular exhibitor there. During this period her work was used as a setting for an electronic music concert with the critic Dorothy Walker noting her designs had a rhythmic quality. From the 1970s, Wejchert won commissions for public art, starting with the 1971 wood and acrylic wall relief in the arts building at University College Dublin. In the same year, the Bank of Ireland purchased Blue form 1971 and then Flowing relief in 1972. Her 1971 triptych, Life, was commissioned for the Irish Life headquarters in Abbey Street. The Lombard and Ulster Bank in Dublin commissioned untitled in 1980, and AIB purchased Freedom in 1985 for their branch in Ballbridge. Her entry for a competition in 1975 for a stamp marking International Women's Year, featuring an image of hands reaching for a dove with an olive branch won.

Wejchert became an Irish citizen in 1979, a member of Aosdána in 1981, and a member of the Royal Hibernian Academy (RHA) in 1995. She was recognised internationally when she was the only Irish sculptor included in Louis Redstone's new directions (1981). She was shown at the Solomon gallery from 1989 numerous times, including a solo show in 1992. A number of her most important pieces were for Irish universities, such as Geometric form at the University of Limerick and Flame at the University College Cork in 1995, her last work. She died suddenly at her home on Tivoli Road, Dún Laoghaire on 24 October 1995. She had one son, Jacob. The RHA held a posthumous exhibition of her work in 1995. Wejchert is said to have influenced the younger generation of Irish sculptors, including Vivienne Roche, Eilis O'Connell, and Michael Warren. Flame was selected to be a part of the Irish Artists' Century exhibition at the RHA in 2000.

References

1921 births
1995 deaths
Artists from Kraków
Irish women sculptors
Polish women sculptors
20th-century sculptors
20th-century Polish women artists
20th-century Irish women artists
Polish emigrants to Ireland